Ivette is a feminine given name and variant of Yvette. Notable people with the name include:

 Ivette Cordovez (born 1979), Panamanian news presenter, actress and model
 Ivette Ezeta Salcedo (born 1969), Mexican politician
 Ivette Fuentes (born 1972), theoretical physicist
 Ivette López (born 1990), Spanish tennis player
 Ivette María (born 1975), Spanish backstroke swimmer
 Ivette Jacqueline Ramírez Corral (born 1981), Mexican politician

See also 
 List of storms named Ivette

References 

Spanish feminine given names